The Cairo League is a former Egyptian football tournament. Before the start of Egyptian Premier League in its current form, the main competition was the Egypt Cup which started 1921. Egyptian federation started its 1st league competition (1938) in the form of regional leagues (Cairo, Alexandria, Bahary & Canal). The competition was played along with the new league form (1948–1953) then finally stopped. Five teams participated in this league Zamalek, Al Ahly, Sekka, Police & Greek Clubs. The Championship was then held once more in 1957–58 but was then stopped again.

Honours
 
The past Winners are:

Performances

References

1^ https://web.archive.org/web/20160919040602/http://new.el-ahly.com/mobile/Story.aspx?newsid=47798
2^ https://www.el-ahly.com/pages/News?aid=47798

External links
 https://www.el-ahly.com/pages/News?aid=47798
 https://web.archive.org/web/20160919040602/http://new.el-ahly.com/mobile/Story.aspx?newsid=47798
 الأهلي 131 بطولة محلياً وعربياً وقارياً

 
Defunct football competitions in Egypt